Cégep de l'Abitibi-Témiscamingue is a public college-level institute of education (CEGEP) with its main campus located in Rouyn-Noranda, Quebec, Canada.  The CEGEP has two additional campuses, in Amos and Val-d'Or.  It was founded in 1967, and 2,500 students are currently enrolled.  Programs are offered in mining and forestry, as well as social, technical, industrial, and communications professions.

History
The college traces its origins to the merger of several institutions which became public ones in 1967, when the Quebec system of CEGEPs was created.

Programs
The Cégep de l'Abitibi-Témiscamingue offers: pre-university and technical programs; continuing education and services to business. Situated in a region of resource development, the Cégep trains mining and forestry technicians; social workers, new economy, communications and technology, sophisticated industrial equipment. The Province of Quebec awards a Diploma of Collegial Studies for two types of programs: two years of pre-university studies or three years of vocational (technical) studies.

Campus
The Campus d'Amos is located at 341 Principale Street North, Amos, Quebec. Founded in 1983, the campus serves 200 students, with a combination of pre-university and technical programs, continuing education and programs for businesses, business, management, agricultural science, humanities.
The Campus de Rouyn-Noranda (siège social) is located at 425 Boulevard du Collège Rouyn-Noranda, Quebec. Founded in 1967 as Cégep de Rouyn, the Cégep de l'Abitibi-Témiscamingue currently has 1800 students. The programs offered include pre-university and technical studies, nursing, forestry engineering technology, arts, and technology of industrial maintenance,  electronics, mineral technology, early childhood education, special education, social work, management, accounting, computer technology and police techniques.
The Campus de Val-d'Or is located at 675 1re Avenue Est, Val-d'Or, Quebec. Founded in 1988, the Campus in Val-d'Oris is housed in Centre d'études supérieures Lucien-Cliche, on the campus of the Université du Québec en Abitibi-Témiscamingue. There are 500 students.

See also
List of colleges in Quebec
Higher education in Quebec

References

External links
Cégep de l'Abitibi-Témiscamingue Website 

Educational institutions established in 1967
Abitibi-Temiscamingue
Education in Abitibi-Témiscamingue
Rouyn-Noranda
Buildings and structures in Abitibi-Témiscamingue
1967 establishments in Quebec